Ballé is a village and seat of the commune of Dogofry in the Cercle of Nara in the Koulikoro Region of south-western Mali, just south the border with Mauritania.

References

Populated places in Koulikoro Region